134 Tauri is a single star in the zodiac constellation of Taurus. Its apparent magnitude is 4.89, which is bright enough to be faintly visible to the naked eye.

This is an MK-standard star with a stellar classification of B9 IV, matching a subgiant star that is evolving away from the main sequence having exhausted the hydrogen at its core. It has a low projected rotational velocity of 26 km/s. The star is about 248 million years old with three times the mass of the Sun and approximately 3.3 times the Sun's radius. It is radiating around 78 times the Sun's luminosity from its photosphere at an effective temperature of about 11,150 K.

References

B-type subgiants
Taurus (constellation)
Durchmusterung objects
Tauri, 134
038899
027511
2010